Laurențiu Rotaru (born 19 January 1970) is a Romanian former rugby union football player. He played as a prop. He also played for Romania's national team, the Oaks, making his international debut in a match against the Le XV de France.

Club career
Laurențiu Rotaru played during his career for professional SuperLiga club, Farul Constanța. He also played with Farul in the European Rugby Challenge Cup competition.

International career
Rotaru was selected for 4th  Rugby World Cup in 1999, playing two test matches against Australia and Ireland.

References

External links
 
 

1970 births
Living people
Sportspeople from Botoșani
Romanian rugby union players
Romania international rugby union players
Rugby union props
RCJ Farul Constanța players